Reinbeck is a city in Grundy County, Iowa, United States. The population was 1,662 at the 2020 census—a five percent decrease from the population of 1,751 in 2000. It is part of the Waterloo–Cedar Falls Metropolitan Statistical Area and is in the Cedar Valley.

Geography
Reinbeck is located at  (42.322218, -92.598696), along Iowa Highway 175.

Recreation
Reinbeck is host to a golf course, various sports fields, a bike trail and hunting range, and a swimming pool. The pool features a zero depth entry zone, a high board and a low board, a water slide, in addition to changing rooms and a concession stand.

Demographics

2010 census
As of the census of 2010, there were 1,664 people, 738 households, and 468 families living in the city. The racial makeup of the city was 98.7% White, 0.2% African American, 0.1% Native American, 0.1% Asian, 0.5% from other races, and 0.4% from two or more races. Hispanic or Latino of any race were 1.1% of the population.

There were 738 households, of which 25.7% had children under the age of 18 living with them, 52.4% were married couples living together, 6.9% had a female householder with no husband present, 4.1% had a male householder with no wife present, and 36.6% were non-families. 32.0% of all households were made up of individuals, and 18.7% had someone living alone who was 65 years of age or older. The average household size was 2.20 and the average family size was 2.72.

The median age in the city was 45.1 years. 20.9% of residents were under the age of 18; 7.8% were between the ages of 18 and 24; 21.2% were from 25 to 44; 26% were from 45 to 64; and 24% were 65 years of age or older. The gender makeup of the city was 48.5% male and 51.5% female.

2000 census
As of the census of 2000, there were 1,751 people, 730 households, and 492 families living in the city. The racial makeup of the city was 99.60% White, 0.11% African American, 0.17% Asian, 0.06% from other races, and 0.06% from two or more races. Hispanic or Latino of any race were 0.40% of the population.

There were 730 households, out of which 28.2% had children under the age of 18 living with them, 58.8% were married couples living together, 6.7% had a female householder with no husband present, and 32.6% were non-families. 29.9% of all households were made up of individuals, and 17.8% had someone living alone who was 65 years of age or older. The average household size was 2.33 and the average family size was 2.87.

23.5% were under the age of 18, 6.3% from 18 to 24, 25.3% from 25 to 44, 21.5% from 45 to 64, and 23.4% were 65 years of age or older. The median age was 42 years. For every 100 females, there were 90.5 males. For every 100 females age 18 and over, there were 84.6 males.

The median income for a household in the city was $36,667, and the median income for a family was $45,938. Males had a median income of $32,829 versus $21,618 for females. The per capita income for the city was $19,814. About 3.3% of families and 4.0% of the population were below the poverty line, including 2.3% of those under age 18 and 6.1% of those age 65 or over.

Education
The city is served by the Gladbrook–Reinbeck Community School District, known as Gladbrook–Reinbeck school district or "G-R" as the locals refer to it.  The G-R mascot is the Rebel.

The city was served by the Reinbeck Community School District until it consolidated on July 1, 1988.

References

External links

 
City-Data Comprehensive statistical data and more about Reinbeck

Cities in Grundy County, Iowa
Cities in Iowa
Waterloo – Cedar Falls metropolitan area